Oleksandr Babarynka (born 2 May 1984) is a male Ukrainian long-distance runner. He competed in the marathon event at the 2015 World Championships in Athletics in Beijing, China, but did not finish.

See also
 Ukraine at the 2015 World Championships in Athletics

References

Ukrainian male long-distance runners
Living people
Place of birth missing (living people)
1982 births
World Athletics Championships athletes for Ukraine
Ukrainian male marathon runners